Tcho can refer to:

TCHO a craft chocolate company based in Berkeley, California
Tchô! a French-Belgian comics magazine